Sinusoidal plane-wave solutions are particular solutions to the electromagnetic wave equation.

The general solution of the electromagnetic wave equation in homogeneous, linear, time-independent media can be written as a linear superposition of plane-waves of different frequencies and polarizations.

The treatment in this article is classical but, because of the generality of Maxwell's equations for electrodynamics, the treatment can be converted into the quantum mechanical treatment with only a reinterpretation of classical quantities (aside from the quantum mechanical treatment needed for charge and current densities).

The reinterpretation is based on the theories of Max Planck and the interpretations by Albert Einstein  of those theories and of other experiments. The quantum generalization of the classical treatment can be found in the articles on photon polarization and photon dynamics in the double-slit experiment.

Explanation 

Experimentally, every light signal can be decomposed into a spectrum of frequencies and wavelengths associated with sinusoidal solutions of the wave equation. Polarizing filters can be used to decompose light into its various polarization components. The polarization components can be linear, circular or elliptical.

Plane waves

The plane sinusoidal solution for an electromagnetic wave traveling in the z direction is

for the electric field and

for the magnetic field, where k is the wavenumber,

The hats on the vectors indicate unit vectors in the x, y, and z directions.  is the position vector (in meters).

The plane wave is parameterized by the amplitudes

and phases

where

and

Polarization state vector

Jones vector

All the polarization information can be reduced to a single vector, called the Jones vector, in the x-y plane. This vector, while arising from a purely classical treatment of polarization, can be interpreted as a quantum state vector. The connection with quantum mechanics  is made in the article on photon polarization.

The vector emerges from the plane-wave solution. The electric field solution can be rewritten in complex notation as

where

is the Jones vector in the x-y plane. The notation for this vector is the bra–ket notation of Dirac, which is normally used in a quantum context. The quantum notation is used here in anticipation of the interpretation of the Jones vector as a quantum state vector.

Dual Jones vector
The Jones vector has a dual given by

Normalization of the Jones vector

A Jones vector represents a specific wave with a specific phase, amplitude and state of polarization. When one is using a Jones vector simply to indicate a state of polarization, then it is customary for it to be normalized. That requires that the inner product of the vector with itself to be unity:

An arbitrary Jones vector can simply be scaled to achieve this property. All normalized Jones vectors represent a wave of the same intensity (within a particular isotropic medium). Even given a normalized Jones vector, multiplication by a pure phase factor will result in a different normalized Jones vector representing the same state of polarization.

Polarization states

Linear polarization

In general, the wave is linearly polarized when the phase angles  are equal,

This represents a wave polarized at an angle  with respect to the x axis. In that case the Jones vector can be written

Elliptical and circular polarization

The general case in which the electric field is not confined to one direction but rotates in the x-y plane is called elliptical polarization. The state vector is given by

The two circular polarization states are thus given by the Jones vectors:

See also

Fourier series
Transverse mode
Transverse wave
Theoretical and experimental justification for the Schrödinger equation
Maxwell's equations
Electromagnetic wave equation
Mathematical descriptions of the electromagnetic field
 Polarization from an atomic transition: linear and circular

References

Sinusoidal plane-wave solutions of the electromagnetic wave equation
Sinusoidal plane-wave solutions of the electromagnetic wave equation
Sinusoidal plane-wave solutions of the electromagnetic wave equation